Energy is an unincorporated community located in Comanche County in Central Texas. According to the Handbook of Texas, the community had a population of 65 in 2000.

History
The area in what is now known as Energy today was first settled around 1896. Will and Charlie Baxter operated a store in the community and named it for the residents who lived in the community, who were described as "energetic". A post office was established at Energy around 1896, with John W. Moore serving as postmaster. Its population was 67 in 1940 and decreased by two residents from 1990 through 2000.

Although Energy is unincorporated, it has a post office, with the ZIP Code of 76452.

Geography

Education
Public education in the community of Energy is provided by the Gustine Independent School District.

References

Unincorporated communities in Comanche County, Texas
Unincorporated communities in Texas